Potato famine may refer to:

European Potato Famine, the wider agrarian crisis in Europe contemporaneous to the Irish and Highland potato famines in the mid-1840s
Ireland's Great Famine, the famine in Ireland between 1845 and 1852
 Scotland's Highland Potato Famine, a major agrarian crisis in the Scottish Highlands from 1846 to 1857